NI or Ni may refer to:

Arts and entertainment
 Ni, or Nishada, the seventh note of the Indian musical scale in raga
 New Internationalist, a magazine
 Knights Who Say "Ni!", characters from the film Monty Python and the Holy Grail

Businesses
 National Instruments, a U.S. producer of automated test equipment and virtual instrumentation software
 National Insurance, a system of taxes and related social security benefits in the United Kingdom
 Native Instruments, a music software production company
 News International, a British newspaper publisher
 Portugália airline (IATA code NI)

Language 
 Ni (letter), or Nu, a letter in the Greek alphabet: uppercase Ν, lowercase ν
 Ni (kana), romanisation of the Japanese kana に and ニ
 Ni (cuneiform), a sign in cuneiform writing

Names 
 Ni (surname) (倪), a Chinese surname
 Ní, a surname prefix from the shortened form of the Irish word for a daughter
 Ni, female prefix to some Balinese names

Places
 Ni River (New Caledonia), a river of New Caledonia
 Ni River (Virginia), a tributary of the Mattaponi River
 Mount Ni, a hill in Shandong, China
 Nicaragua (ISO 3166 NI)
 .ni, Nicaragua's internet domain
 Norfolk Island, an external territory of Australia
 North Island, one of the two main islands of New Zealand
 Northern Ireland, a constituent country of the United Kingdom
 Lower Saxony (German: Niedersachsen; ISO 3166 code DE-NI), a state of Germany

Science and technology
 Nickel, symbol Ni, a chemical element
 Ampere-turns, sometimes abbreviated NI
 Natural insemination i.e. sexual intercourse, in contrast to artificial insemination
 Nitrogen Triiodide, a sensitive contact explosive
Natural intelligence, a term used to contrast intelligence found in nature, particularly in man, from artificial intelligence
Neonatal isoerythrolysis, a disease when the mother has antibodies against the blood type of the newborn

Other uses
 NI Tank, a Russian military vehicle
 N-I (rocket), a Japanese rocket based on the U.S. Delta/Thor family
 Nishan-e-Imtiaz, a Pakistani civilian decoration
 Non-Inscrits (NI), members of the European Parliament not enrolled in any political group of the European Parliament
 Introverted intuition, one of eight cognitive functions postulated by the Myers–Briggs Type Indicator

See also

 Nee (disambiguation)
 NL (disambiguation)
 N1 (disambiguation)